Piscator, also known as the Euston Head, is a large abstract sculpture by Eduardo Paolozzi.  It was commissioned by British Rail in 1980 for the forecourt of Euston Station in London, and is named for the German theatre director Erwin Piscator.

The sculpture is made from cast iron with an aluminium finish, and was cast by the ironfounders Robert Taylor and Co.  It measures . In making the work, Paolozzi was assisted by Ray Watson.   The sides of the sculpture have silvered bumps and hollows; viewed from above, the top surface resolves into a blocky human body and face. It is described in Pevsner as "a silvered block with curved hollows, and rectangular shapes above".

In late 2016, it was reported that the ownership of the sculpture was unclear.  It was commissioned by British Rail, which was privatised in the 1990s, and the sculpture may have been inherited by Network Rail, who owns the freehold of the land on which it sits.  However, Network Rail has denied ownership, saying that the land is leased to Sydney & London Properties, but the leaseholders have also denied any responsibility for the sculpture. It has since been discovered that the Arts Council of England owns the work.

A series of six  models in bronze were also cast, with one held by the Science Museum.

Gallery

References

 Major Paolozzi sculpture facing decay 'because no one wants to own it', The Guardian, 28 November 2016
 Paolozzi sculpture at Euston is one of many works of art left to rot, The Guardian, 29 November 2016
 Major Public Sculpture by Eduardo Paolozzi at Risk as Owners Can’t Be Found, artnet.com, 29 November 2016 
 Euston sculpture left to rot in the street because no-one can work out who owns it, Evening Standard, 29 November 2016 
 Sir Eduardo Paolozzi RA (1924–2005), Piscator or Euston Head, bronze on a pine plinth, the-saleroom.com, 2 June 2015 
 Sir Eduardo Paolozzi, R.A. (1924–2005), Christie's, December 2016 
 Piscator (Euston Head), Science Museum

1980 sculptures
Abstract sculptures in the United Kingdom
Aluminium sculptures in the United Kingdom
Buildings and structures in the London Borough of Camden
Iron sculptures in the United Kingdom
Outdoor sculptures in London
Cast-iron sculptures